Jefferson Township is an inactive township in Shelby County, in the U.S. state of Missouri.

Jefferson Township was erected in the 1868, taking its name from President Thomas Jefferson.

References

Townships in Missouri
Townships in Shelby County, Missouri